Aleksandr Kosenkov (born 28 July 1956) is a Belarusian former diver who competed in the 1976 Summer Olympics and in the 1980 Summer Olympics.

References

External links

1956 births
Living people
Belarusian male divers
Olympic divers of the Soviet Union
Divers at the 1976 Summer Olympics
Divers at the 1980 Summer Olympics
Olympic bronze medalists for the Soviet Union
Olympic medalists in diving
Medalists at the 1976 Summer Olympics
Universiade medalists in diving
Universiade gold medalists for the Soviet Union
Universiade bronze medalists for the Soviet Union
Medalists at the 1977 Summer Universiade
Medalists at the 1979 Summer Universiade